Vyshhorod Raion is a raion (district) in Kyiv Oblast of Ukraine. Its administrative center is the city of Vyshhorod. It has a population of 

On 18 July 2020, as part of the administrative reform of Ukraine, the number of raions of Kyiv Oblast was reduced to seven, and the area of Vyshhorod Raion was significantly expanded. Two abolished raions, Ivankiv and Poliske Raions, as well as the cities of Slavutych and Vyshhorod, which were previously incorporated as cities of oblast significance and did not belong to the raion, were merged into Vyshhorod Raion. The January 2020 estimate of the raion population was

Description
The raion was created on April 12, 1973, from territories of Ivankiv Raion and Kyiv-Sviatoshyn Raion. The raion is located around the Kyiv Reservoir. Its administrative center is at the southern edge of the territory.

Before 2020, the raion bordered four other raions of Kyiv Oblast and two other regions of Ukraine – the city of Kyiv and Chernihiv Oblast. To the north and northwest from the raion Ivankiv Raion was located which also included territory of the former Chernobyl Raion, to the west there was Borodianka Raion, to the southwest Vyshhorod Raion bordered with Kyiv-Sviatoshyn Raion, to the south with Obolon Raion of the city of Kyiv, to the southeast with Brovary Raion, while to the east and northeast it bordered Kozelets Raion of Chernihiv Oblast.

Former President of Ukraine Viktor Yanukovych's private residence Mezhyhirya is located near the village of Novi Petrivtsi.

Subdivisions

Current
After the reform in July 2020, the raion consisted of 7 hromadas:
 Dymer settlement hromada with the administration in the urban-type settlement in Dymer;
 Ivankiv settlement hromada with the administration in the urban-type settlement of Ivankiv, transferred from Ivankiv Raion; 
 Petrivtsi rural hromada with the administration in the selo of Novi Petrivtsi;
 Pirnove rural hromada with the administration in the selo of Pirnove;
 Poliske settlement hromada with the administration in the urban-type settlement of Krasiatychi, transferred from Poliske Raion;
 Slavutych urban hromada with the administration in the city of Slavutych, transferred from the city of oblast significance of Slavutych; 
 Vyshhorod urban hromada with the administration in the city of Vyshhorod.

Before 2020

Before the 2020 reform, the raion consisted of four hromadas, 
 Dymer settlement hromada with the administration in Dymer;
 Petrivtsi rural hromada with the administration in Novi Petrivtsi;
 Pirnove rural hromada with the administration in Pirnove;
 Vyshhorod urban hromada with the administration in Vyshhorod.

Notable people 
 Hanna Veres, textile artist

References

External links 
 Official Site Вишгородської райдержадміністрації
 Oficial Site Вишгородської районної ради 
 Official Invest Portal Vyshhorod Raion

 
Raions of Kyiv Oblast
Kyiv metropolitan area
1973 establishments in Ukraine